Austin Kenneth Wells (born July 12, 1999) is an American professional baseball catcher in the New York Yankees organization.

Amateur career
Wells grew up in Las Vegas, Nevada and attended Bishop Gorman High School. As a junior, he was named the Nevada Gatorade Player of the Year and a second team All-American by USA Today and played in the Under Armour All-America Baseball Game after finishing the season with a .500 batting average with eight home runs and 47 runs batted in (RBIs). He committed to play college baseball at the University of Arizona, where his father played baseball and his mother had competed in gymnastics, during his junior year. Wells batted .527 with 20 doubles, six triples and four home runs while scoring 46 runs and batting in 46 runs. Wells was selected by the New York Yankees in the 35th round of the 2018 Major League Baseball draft, but he opted not to sign and enroll at Arizona.

As a true freshman, Wells batted .353 with 73 runs, 15 doubles, seven triples, five home runs and 60 RBIs and was named the Pac-12 Conference Freshman on the Year. Following the end of the season Wells played for the Yarmouth–Dennis Red Sox of the Cape Cod Baseball League and was named a league All-Star and was awarded the Robert A. McNeese Outstanding Pro Prospect Award after hitting .308 with seven home runs and 26 RBIs.

Wells was named a second team preseason All-American by Baseball America, the Collegiate Baseball Newspaper, and to the third team by the National Collegiate Baseball Writers Association. He also was placed on the watchlist for the Golden Spikes Award going into his sophomore season. Wells batted .375 with two home runs, 14 RBIs and a 1.116 OPS in 15 games before the season was cut short due to the coronavirus pandemic.

Professional career
Wells was selected 28th overall by the New York Yankees the 2020 MLB Draft. Wells signed with the Yankees on June 25 for a $2.5 million bonus. According to Baseball America, Wells is currently the #5 ranked Yankees Prospect in the team's farm system. Wells was named to the Yankees' 2021 Spring Training roster as a non-roster invitee.

Wells was assigned to the Low-A Tampa Tarpons to start the 2021 minor league season before being promoted to the High-A Hudson Valley Renegades in late July. He finished the season hitting a combined .264/.390/.476 over 103 games, hitting 16 home runs with 76 RBIs. After the season, the Yankees announced he was joining the Surprise Saguaros in the Arizona Fall League. 
He currently plays for the Double-A Somerset Patriots.

References

External links

Arizona Wildcats bio

Living people
Baseball players from Nevada
Baseball catchers
Arizona Wildcats baseball players
Yarmouth–Dennis Red Sox players
Sportspeople from Las Vegas
Bishop Gorman High School alumni
1999 births
Tampa Tarpons players
Hudson Valley Renegades players
Somerset Patriots players